Vanguard College is a Pentecostal theological institute, located in Edmonton, Alberta, Canada. It is affiliated with the Pentecostal Assemblies of Canada.

History
Vanguard College was founded in 1946 as Canadian Northwest Bible Institute (CNBI) by D.N. Buntain. The first classes, towards a three-year Bible diploma program, in the original Central Pentecostal Tabernacle building in Edmonton enrolled forty students and employed six part-time staff. The Canadian Northwest Bible Institute was renamed Northwest Bible College (NBC) in 1964. Northwest Bible College became Vanguard College in May 2004.

Program
To prepare its graduates for ministry, the school offers one- to four-year programs in a variety of disciplines. Students may pursue a Bachelor of Arts (BA) or a Bachelor of Theology (BTh), and select from several specializations, including Children and Family, Intercultural Studies, Pastoral Studies, Worship Arts, and Youth Ministry. Vanguard also offers one-year certificate programs in these areas. Students are required to do field education, or practical ministry, each academic year. Distance Education courses are provided through Vanguard College's International Biblical Online Leadership Training (IBOLT) department.

Partnerships
It is affiliated with the Pentecostal Assemblies of Canada and accredited through the Association for Biblical Higher Education (ABHE).

Residences
Although Vanguard College is a non-resident campus, Student Housing is offered to first year students. Student Housing consists of fully furnished apartments in the neighbourhood of the college that are sub-leased to students throughout the school year. In addition, the Second Home Initiative helps students locate possible apartments and/or roommates.

References

External links 
 
 International Biblical Online Leadership Training

Universities and colleges in Edmonton
Colleges in Alberta
Northwest Bible College
Northwest Bible College
Vanguard College
Evangelical seminaries and theological colleges in Canada
Northwest Bible College
Northwest Bible College
Vanguard College
Assemblies of God seminaries and theological colleges